Parkgate & Rawmarsh United F.C. was an English association football club based in Parkgate, Rotherham, South Yorkshire.

History
The club was formed in 1906, and played six seasons in the Sheffield Association League, as well as competing in the FA Cup on numerous occasions

Records
Best FA Cup performance: 1st Qualifying Round, 1909–10

References

Defunct football clubs in England
Defunct football clubs in South Yorkshire
Sheffield Association League